De Zeemeerman is a 1996 Dutch comedy film directed by Frank Herrebout. The movie revolves around a young man who has a hard time getting girls because he permanently smells of fish. The cure, offered by a mad professor, turns him into a male mermaid, or mer-man ('zeemeerman' in Dutch).

According to 134,000 users of website moviemeter.nl, De Zeemeerman is the worst Dutch movie of all time, scoring #3 in the list of worst movies overall (with National Lampoon's Pledge This! in the number one spot). Ed Starink composed the main theme.

Cast
Daniël Boissevain	... 	Tony Pellicano
Gonny Gaakeer	... 	Julie / Natasja
Angelique de Bruijne... 	Suzy
Frans van Deursen	... 	Gregor
Huub Stapel	... 	Timo Babel
Manuëla Kemp	... 	Christa
Peter Faber	... 	Simon
Serge-Henri Valcke	... 	Pedro
Jerome Reehuis	... 	Professor Swezick
Joke Bruijs	... 	Mevrouw Romijn
Katja Schuurman	... 	Bea
Gert-Jan Dröge	... 	Maitre d'Hotel
Marjolein Sligte	... 	Wilma
Romijn Conen	... 	Wim Evers

References

External links 
 

Dutch comedy films
1996 films
1990s Dutch-language films
1996 comedy films
Films produced by Rob Houwer
Films about mermaids